Mirabad-e Emam Qoli (also Romanized as Mīrābād-e Emām Qolī; also known as Mīrābād) is a village in Chahdegal Rural District, Negin Kavir District, Fahraj County, Kerman Province, Iran. At the 2006 census, its population was 690, in 157 families.

In 2013, the remains of a Sasanid-era Zoroastrian fire temple were discovered at Mirabad-e Emam Qoli.

References 

Populated places in Fahraj County
Religion in the Sasanian Empire
Sasanian architecture